Teen Universe 2015 was the 5th Teen Universe pageant, held on February 6, 2015 at Teatro Abril, Guatemala. The contest was organized under the organization of Alexander Montiel (President/CEO), and Oswaldo Zambrana Contreras (franchise manager). The competition was held for one week, where 23 contestants competed for the crown.

During the competition there were different types of challenges and evaluation, that determined the decision from the judges to select the next winner. Vivianie Díaz of the United States crowned her successor Dayanara Peralta of Ecuador.

Results

Placements

§ – placed into the Top 12 by online voting

Special Awards

Contestants
23 contestants competed for the title.

References

External links
 Official Facebook
 Teen Universe
 Official Twitter

2015 beauty pageants
2015 in Guatemala